Sir Alexander Anstruther (10 September 1769 – 16 July 1819) was a Scottish judge in India during the East India Company administration of the Madras and Bombay Presidencies.

Life
Anstruther was the second son of Sir Robert Anstruther, 3rd Baronet, of Balcaskie, Fife. He was called to the bar at Lincoln's Inn, and published 'Reports of Cases argued and determined in the Court of Exchequer, from Easter Term 32 George III to Trinity Term 37 George III, both inclusive,' which were published in three volumes in 1796 and 1797, and were reprinted for a second edition in 1817.

Anstruther went out to India in 1798, and was appointed Advocate-General of Madras in 1803. In March 1812 he succeeded Sir John Henry Newbolt as Recorder of Bombay, and was knighted. While on his voyage out to India he wrote a small work on Light, Heat, and Electricity.

Alexander married Sarah Prendergast, the widow of Captain William Selby of the Bombay Marine, on 14th March 1803 in Surat. They had nine children. Alexander died in Mauritius in 1819 leaving Sarah with her seven surviving children. Sarah returned to Scotland and died at Airth Castle in 1865.

He died at Mauritius in 1819.

References

1769 births
1819 deaths
People from Fife
19th-century Scottish judges
British people in colonial India
British India judges
Younger sons of baronets
18th-century Scottish lawyers
Advocates General for Tamil Nadu
Members of Lincoln's Inn
Alexander, Judge